The Municipality of Pembina is a rural municipality (RM) in the Canadian province of Manitoba.

History

The municipality was incorporated on January 1, 2015 via the amalgamation of the RM of Pembina and the Town of Manitou. It was formed as a requirement of The Municipal Amalgamations Act, which required that municipalities with a population less than 1,000 amalgamate with one or more neighbouring municipalities by 2015. The Government of Manitoba initiated these amalgamations in order for municipalities to meet the 1997 minimum population requirement of 1,000 to incorporate a municipality.

Communities 
 Darlingford
 Kaleida
 La Rivière
 Manitou
 Snowflake

Demographics 

See also
Maida–Windygates Border Crossing

External links 
 Pembina Manitou Archive (Pembina Manitou Culture and Heritage Association)

References 

2015 establishments in Manitoba
Manitoba municipal amalgamations, 2015
Populated places established in 2015
Rural municipalities in Manitoba